xconfig is the name of the xconfig Makefile target for the Linux kernel. It is a graphical Linux compilation utility, which uses Qt. The xconfig utility is invoked by running make xconfig in the base Linux source directory.

Qt has only been used since kernel 2.6. Kernel 2.4 uses a Tcl/Tk configuration interface. A GTK+ interface (gconfig) is also available since kernel 2.6.

Inside, there are options to display the configurations in three different hierarchies; single, split, full. A Find function is available to search for text within the config's titles.

A bottom pane displays information on the selected option, and metadata of it (depends, type, short name).

See also
 menuconfig

Linux configuration utilities
Linux kernel
Software that uses Qt